Carlia fusca, the brown four-fingered skink or Indonesian brown skink, is a species of skink in the genus Carlia. It is endemic to Halmahera in Indonesia and Bismarck Archipelago in Papua New Guinea

References

Carlia
Reptiles described in 1839
Skinks of New Guinea
Taxa named by André Marie Constant Duméril
Taxa named by Gabriel Bibron